Lee Point is a northern suburb of the city of Darwin, Northern Territory, Australia.

History
Lee Point is not yet a developed suburb. The suburb name is derived from the point "Lee Point" which appears on Goyder's 1869 Plan of Port Darwin and probably dates back to Stokes' examination of the harbour in 1839. A short distance from the beach's carpark, one can find a well-preserved bunker used during World War II along the cycle path, which runs from Lee Point to Brinkin.

References

External links

https://web.archive.org/web/20110629040718/http://www.nt.gov.au/lands/lis/placenames/origins/greaterdarwin.shtml#l#l

Suburbs of Darwin, Northern Territory